Groß-Gerau is an electoral constituency (German: Wahlkreis) represented in the Bundestag. It elects one member via first-past-the-post voting. Under the current constituency numbering system, it is designated as constituency 184. It is located in southern Hesse, comprising the Groß-Gerau district.

Groß-Gerau was created for the inaugural 1949 federal election. Since 2021, it has been represented by Melanie Wegling of the Social Democratic Party (SPD).

Geography
Groß-Gerau is located in southern Hesse. As of the 2021 federal election, it is coterminous with the Groß-Gerau district.

History
Groß-Gerau was created in 1949. In the 1949 election, it was Hesse constituency 18 in the numbering system. From 1953 through 1976, it was number 143. From 1980 through 1998, it was number 141. In the 2002 and 2005 elections, it was number 185. Since the 2009 election, it has been number 184.

Originally, the constituency comprised the districts of Groß-Gerau and Main-Taunus-Kreis. In the 1965 through 1972 elections, it comprised the Groß-Gerau district and the modern municipalities of Eppstein, Hofheim am Taunus, Hattersheim am Main, Kriftel, Flörsheim am Main, and Hochheim am Main from the Main-Taunus-Kreis district. In the 1976 through 1998 elections, it comprised the Groß-Gerau district and the municipalities of Hofheim am Taunus, Flörsheim am Main, and Hochheim am Main from the Main-Taunus-Kreis district. Since the 2002 election, it has been coterminous with the Groß-Gerau district.

Members
The constituency was first represented by Ludwig Bergsträsser of the Social Democratic Party (SPD) from 1949 to 1953. He was succeeded by fellow SPD member Hermann Schmitt-Vockenhausen, who served from 1953 to 1980, a total of seven consecutive terms. Norbert Wieczorek of the SPD then served a single term before Otto Zink of the Christian Democratic Union (CDU) won the constituency in 1983. Former member Wieczorek regained it for the SPD in 1990, but Heinz-Adolf Hörsken returned to the CDU in 1994. Wieczorek won a third non-consecutive term in 1998, and was succeeded by fellow SPD member Gerold Reichenbach in the 2002 election, who served two terms. Franz Josef Jung of the CDU won the constituency in 2009 and served until 2017. Stefan Sauer of the CDU was elected in 2017. Melanie Wegling regained it for the SPD in 2021.

Election results

2021 election

2017 election

2013 election

2009 election

References

Federal electoral districts in Hesse
1949 establishments in West Germany
Constituencies established in 1949
Groß-Gerau (district)